Soragno is a village in the district of Lugano in the canton of Ticino, Switzerland.

It was first recorded in 1335 as Soragnio.

The village, together with Davesco, constituted the former municipality Davesco-Soragno. In 2004, Davesco-Soragno municipality was incorporated into the larger, neighboring municipality Lugano and now forms a quarter of that city.

References

Villages in Ticino
Lugano